This is a list of Falkirk Football Club seasons from 1878–79 to the present day. The list details Falkirk's record in major league and cup competitions, and the club's top league goal scorer of each season where available. Top scorers in bold were also the top scorers in Falkirk's division that season. Records of minor competitions such as the Stirlingshire Cup are not included.

The club has been runner-up of the Scottish Football League twice and won the second tier of Scottish football on 7 occasions. The club has reached the final of the Scottish Cup four times, winning 2, most recently in 1957 as well as winning the Scottish Challenge Cup 4 times. Falkirk has competed in a European club competition once; in 2009–10, Falkirk qualified for the inaugural season of the Europa League as runners-up of the 2008–09 Scottish Cup. Falkirk lost to FC Vaduz of Liechtenstein in the second qualifying round 2–1 on aggregate after extra time.

Seasons

Key

P = Played
W = Games won
D = Games drawn
L = Games lost
F = Goals for
A = Goals against
Pts = Points
Pos = Final position

SFD = Scottish Division One
SSD = Scottish Division Two
SPD = Scottish Premier Division
SPL = Scottish Premier League
SFL 1 = Scottish First Division
SFL 2 = Scottish Second Division

QR2 = Qualifying round 2
PR = Preliminary round
R1 = Round 1
R2 = Round 2
R3 = Round 3
R4 = Round 4
R5 = Round 5
QF = Quarter-finals
SF = Semi-finals

Footnotes

References

Seasons
 
Falkirk
Seasons